Sanhe is a town under the administration of Tiantai County, Zhejiang, China. , it has 26 villages under its administration.

References 

Township-level divisions of Zhejiang
Tiantai County